Kolo is a village in the Bamingui-Bangoran Prefecture in the northern Central African Republic.

It is located on the border with Chad.

Populated places in Bamingui-Bangoran
N'Délé
Central African Republic–Chad border crossings